On May 9, 2006, Jeanson James Ancheta (born April 26, 1985) became the first person to be charged for controlling large numbers of hijacked computers or botnets.

Biography
Ancheta was going to Downey High School in Downey, California until 2001 when he dropped out of school.  He later entered an alternative program for students with academic or behavioral problems.  He worked at an Internet cafe and according to his family wanted to join the military reserves.  Around June 2004 he started to work with botnets after discovering rxbot, a common computer worm that could spread his net of infected computers.

Botnets

Botnet is a jargon term for a collection of software robots, or "bots", that run autonomously and automatically.

Arrest and sentence
In November 2005 he was captured in an elaborate sting operation when FBI agents lured him to their local office on the pretext of collecting computer equipment.  The arrest was part of the Operation: Bot Roast.

On May 9, 2006 Ancheta pleaded guilty to four felony charges of violating United States Code Section 1030, Fraud and Related Activity in Connection with Computers, specifically subsections (a)(5)(A)(i), 1030 (a)(5)(B)(i), and 1030(b).  Ancheta must serve 57 months in prison, forfeit a 1993 BMW and more than $58,000 in profit. He must also pay restitution of $15,000 US to the U.S. federal government for infecting the military computers.

See also
 List of convicted computer criminals

References

External links
 US Department of Justice bio

1985 births
Living people
People from Downey, California
American computer criminals
People convicted of cybercrime